Brooks D. Tucker is a former American government official who most recently served as the Chief of Staff for the Department of Veterans Affairs from April 29, 2020 to January 20, 2021 and as Assistant Secretary for Congressional and Legislative Affairs for the Department of Veterans Affairs from August 10, 2017 to January 20, 2021. For his contributions and accomplishments in the Senior Executive Service, he was awarded the Exceptional Service Medal by the Secretary of Veterans Affairs. Tucker is a retired lieutenant colonel and infantry officer in the United States Marine Corps who served in Operation Desert Shield/Desert Storm, Operation Iraqi Freedom and Operation Enduring Freedom (Afghanistan). During his military service he received the Meritorious Service Medal, Navy Commendation Medal with Combat Distinguishing Device and two gold stars in lieu of subsequent awards, Navy Achievement Medal, and Combat Action Ribbon. Prior to his Presidential appointment, Tucker was a senior adviser to the United States Secretary of Veterans Affairs. Tucker previously served on Donald Trump's presidential transition team and as senior policy adviser for national security and veterans' affairs for U.S. Senator Richard Burr. He was formerly an investment adviser for Deutsche Bank and Merrill Lynch.

References

Living people
University System of Maryland alumni
United States Marine Corps officers
Trump administration personnel
Year of birth missing (living people)
United States Department of Veterans Affairs officials